The Lisbon Marathon or the Lisbon Marathon EDP is an annual marathon held in Lisbon, Portugal in the month of October, established in 1986. 

The Marathon starts in the beachside city of Cascais and finishes alongside the Luso Portugal Half Marathon in Lisbon. Both the marathon and half marathon (which starts on the Vasco da Gama Bridge) are IAAF Gold Standard.   The marathon course is flat, fast and incredibly scenic.  Both races feature live music along the course and a Finish Line Concert.

The 2020 edition of the race was postponed to 2021.10.17 due to the coronavirus pandemic.

Winners 
Key:

See also
Lisbon Half Marathon
Portugal Half Marathon

References

Civai, Franco & Loonstra, Klaas (5 December 2011). Cidade de Lisboa Marathon. Association of Road Racing Statisticians. Retrieved on 12 December 2011.

External links 
 
Marathoninfo profile

Marathons in Portugal
Autumn events in Portugal
Annual sporting events in Portugal
Sports festivals in Portugal
Recurring sporting events established in 1986
1986 establishments in Portugal
Annual events in Lisbon
Sports competitions in Lisbon
Sport in Cascais